The following television stations broadcast on digital channel 38 in the United States:

 K38IM in Albuquerque, New Mexico, to move to channel 34
 K38JX-D in Grand Junction, Colorado, to move to channel 14
 K38MM-D in International Falls, Minnesota, to move to channel 35

The following stations, which are no longer licensed, formerly broadcast on digital channel 38:
 K38BU-D in Gruver, Texas
 K38FO-D in Carbondale, Colorado
 K38KZ-D in Bovina, etc., Texas
 K38LK-D in Jacks Cabin, Colorado
 K38OF-D in Crowley, Louisiana
 K38OR-D in Jonesboro, Arkansas
 KNDX-LD in Dickinson, North Dakota
 KVFW-LD in Fort Worth, Texas
 KZMD-LD in Lufkin, Texas
 W38EM-D in Albany, Georgia
 W38FI-D in Laurel, Mississippi
 WALM-LD in Sebring, Florida
 WBMG-LD in Moody, Alabama

References

38 digital